Sindre Iversen (born 5 April 1989) is a Norwegian snowboarder.

His greatest achievement is a third place in a February 2008 big air event during the 2007-08 Snowboarding World Cup circuit. He followed up with a fifth place in March the same year.

See also
Sport in Norway

References

External links
FIS bio

1989 births
Living people
People from Hedmark
Norwegian male snowboarders
Sportspeople from Innlandet
21st-century Norwegian people